David Maree (born 31 August 1989) is a South African road and track cyclist, who currently rides for South African amateur team Enza. He qualified to compete in the omnium at the 2020 Summer Olympics.

Major results

2013
 6th Overall Mzansi Tour
1st Mountains classification
2015
 KZN Autumn Series
5th PMB Road Classic
10th Mayday Classic
2016
 1st  Team pursuit, National Track Championships (with Nolan Hoffman, Morne van Niekerk & Reynard Butler)
2017
 1st  Omnium, National Track Championships
2019
 1st  Points race, National Track Championships
2020
 African Track Championships
1st  Points race
1st  Omnium
2nd  Scratch
3rd  Team pursuit
2021
 African Track Championships
1st  Points race
1st  Team pursuit (with Stephanus van Heerden, Kyle Swanepoel & Dillon Geary)
2nd  Elimination race

References

External links
 

1989 births
Living people
South African male cyclists
People from Kroonstad
South African track cyclists
Cyclists at the 2018 Commonwealth Games
Commonwealth Games competitors for South Africa
Cyclists at the 2020 Summer Olympics
Olympic cyclists of South Africa